Spotorno is a comune (municipality) in the Province of Savona in the Italian region Liguria, located about  southwest of Genoa and about  southwest of Savona. Today the town is an important holiday center of Riviera delle Palme, but in the past fishing and trade were the main economic activities together with the shipyards along the coast which were pretty famous for the building of brigantines.

Spotorno borders the following municipalities: Bergeggi, Noli, Vado Ligure, and Vezzi Portio.

Twin towns
 Bad Dürrheim, Germany
 Høje-Taastrup

References

External links
 Official website

Cities and towns in Liguria